× Sophrolaeliocattleya (from Sophronitis, Laelia and Cattleya, its parent genera) is a nothogenus of artificial intergeneric orchid hybrids. It is abbreviated as Slc. in the horticultural trade.
As of 2008, × Sophrolaeliocattleya is defunct, with the genus Sophronitis having been merged into Cattleya.

Anatomy, morphology and habit
× Sophrolaeliocattleya often shows the influence of its Sophronitis parent strongly; its flowers tend to range through yellow-orange to red, they tend to be smaller, and the general habit of the plant tends to be comparatively compact, all characteristics shared with Sophronitis.

Etymology and taxonomic history

This nothogeneric epithet is derived by putting together the component genera:  Sophronitis (combining form -), Laelia (combining form -) and Cattleya; it is capitalized and is not italicized because it is a nothogeneric epithet.  By 1999, the component genera had been rather stable (with the exception of the discovery of new species) for many decades.

In 2000, many (if not most) of the species of Laelia which had been used in producing Slc. hybrids were moved into the genus Sophronitis.  As a result, many greges which had been in × Sophrolaeliocattleya were moved into the nothogenus × Sophrocattleya, abbreviated Sc.

In 2008, the genus Sophronitis was merged into Cattleya, making the nothogenera × Sophrolaeliocattleya and × Sophrocattleya defunct.  At the same time, several species of Cattleya which had been widely used in hybridization were moved into the new genus Guarianthe.  As a result, greges which were once classified in × Sophrolaeliocattleya are now found in several genera and nothogenera:

Importance to humans
× Sophrolaeliocattleya and other Sophronitis hybrids are commonly crossed to produce a desirable orange or red bloom not generally present in Cattleya hybrids not involving Sophronitis, and the compact shape is well suited for artificial light gardens.

References

Orchid nothogenera
Laeliinae
Historically recognized angiosperm taxa